is a Japanese producer and manager responsible for print advertising campaigns on behalf of clients such as Armani, Donna Karan, Guess?, Pirelli and Vogue magazine, working with photographers such as Peter Lindbergh, Herb Ritts, Helmut Newton and others.

A former actress, she is best known for her roles in British television as a regular cast member of the 1970s series The Protectors (as Suki) and Space: 1999 (as Yasko). She also appeared in the Bulldog Drummond film Deadlier Than the Male (1967), the James Bond film You Only Live Twice (1967), the TV spin-off film Wombling Free (1977), the World War II comedy series It Ain't Half Hot Mum, and the TV series From Here to Eternity.

She has a daughter, Miki Berenyi, who was the lead singer and guitarist of the English alternative rock band Lush.

Filmography

References

External links

1943 births
20th-century Japanese actresses
Businesspeople from Los Angeles
Businesspeople in advertising
Expatriate actresses in the United Kingdom
Japanese expatriates in the United Kingdom
Japanese film actresses
Japanese television actresses
21st-century Japanese businesswomen
21st-century Japanese businesspeople
Living people
Date of birth missing (living people)
Place of birth missing (living people)
20th-century Japanese businesswomen
20th-century Japanese businesspeople